Firuzabad (also Romanized as Fīrūzābād and Fīrūz Ābād) is a city in and capital of Firuzabad District, in Selseleh County, Lorestan Province, Iran. At the 2006 census, its population was 2,857, in 614 families.

References

Towns and villages in Selseleh County
Cities in Lorestan Province